Robert Edward Warren (8 January 1927 – November 2002) was an English professional footballer who played in the Football League as a defender.

References

1927 births
2002 deaths
Sportspeople from Devonport, Plymouth
English footballers
Association football defenders
Plymouth United F.C. players
Plymouth Argyle F.C. players
Chelsea F.C. players
Torquay United F.C. players
English Football League players